Charlotte is an unincorporated community in Independence County, Arkansas, United States. Charlotte has a post office with ZIP code 72522.

Charlotte is served by the Cedar Ridge School District. It was formed on July 1, 2004, from the consolidation of the Cord Charlotte School District and the Newark School District.

References

Unincorporated communities in Independence County, Arkansas
Unincorporated communities in Arkansas